is a former Japanese football player.

Playing career
Tsuruta was born in Fuji on September 9, 1982. He joined J1 League club Shimizu S-Pulse from youth team in 2001. However he could not play at all in the match behind Masanori Sanada. In 2002, he moved to J2 League club Ventforet Kofu on loan. He played many matches as regular goalkeeper in 2002. However his opportunity to play decreased behind newcomer Kensaku Abe in 2003. In 2004, he returned to Shimizu S-Pulse. However he could not play at all in the match behind Yohei Nishibe. In 2005, he moved to J2 club Ventforet Kofu again. Although he played as regular goalkeeper initially, he could hardly play in the match from summer in 2005. Although the club was promoted to J1 from 2006, he could not play many matches in 2006. Although he became a regular goalkeeper again in June 2007, the club was relegated to J2 end of 2007 season. From 2008, he could hardly play in the match behind Shigeru Sakurai and Kota Ogi. In 2010, he moved to J2 club Ehime FC. However he could not play at all in the match behind Hiromasa Yamamoto and Yusuke Kawakita. In 2011, he moved to J2 club Kataller Toyama. However he injured his right knee before opening 2011 season. He came back in October and became a regular goalkeeper. He played many matches as regular goalkeeper until June 2012. However the club gained new goalkeeper Tatsuya Morita in June and Tsuruta could hardly play in the match behind Morita from June. He retired end of 2012 season.

Club statistics

References

External links

1982 births
Living people
Association football people from Shizuoka Prefecture
Japanese footballers
J1 League players
J2 League players
Shimizu S-Pulse players
Ventforet Kofu players
Ehime FC players
Kataller Toyama players
Association football goalkeepers